Vasculaghju is an archaeological site in Corsica. It is located in the commune of Sotta.

Archaeological sites in Corsica